The Ben Maller Show is a sports radio talk show that airs on Fox Sports Radio during the hours of 2:00 AM to 6:00 AM ET that is hosted by Ben Maller. The current edition of The Ben Maller Show debuted on January 6, 2014, after the announcement of a shake-up in the on-air broadcasting lineup. It was announced that with JT The Brick's promotion, the supporting cast of his former slot would be staying on the time slot and thus joining Maller. The supporting cast consists of Eddie Garcia (update anchor and sidekick), Justin Cooper (Coop-de-loop) (executive producer) and Roberto Flores (technical producer).
"Cowboy's Corner," the Maller Show staple which began in 2002 when Maller replaced Jorge Sedano as FSR's late night/ early morning host (the segment started in 2000,FSR's debut with Sedano),will officially end Mar.20,2023, save some special appearances for family members' and friends' birthdays and passings ,as  Brady Baylis,the Windsor,Ont.,Can. lad known as "Cowboy in Windsor," but lately also as "Buckaroo Brady Baylis," will focus on being perhaps the first 70-year-old (Brady's age as of July 6,2023) magazine cover boy,as he's retained his boyish good looks despite an Apr. 2021 stroke and two Covid-19 bouts despite getting four vaccinations,including two boosters,and desgining his brand of cowboy shirts,hats,jeans and buckles . Also,Brady isn't thrilled at the show's seemingly increasing down-market callers ( See:Jed Who Fled ,a not-too-bright Florida good ol' boy who is the living embodiment of what's wrong with Gov. Ron DeSantis' state,as well as Maller's and the show's refusal to address salient American social issues such as racial and other injustices.

References

2014 radio programme debuts
American sports radio programs
Fox Sports original programming